Qipengyuania nanhaisediminis is a Gram-negative, rod-shaped and slightly halophilic bacteria from the genus Qipengyuania which has been isolated from sediment from the South China Sea.

References

Further reading

External links
Type strain of Erythrobacter nanhaisediminis at BacDive -  the Bacterial Diversity Metadatabase

Sphingomonadales
Bacteria described in 2010